Rajko Müller, better known by his stage name Isolée, is a German electronic music producer. He is noted for his work in the microhouse genre, reminiscent of indie electronic pop music of the early eighties and ambient techno from a decade on. Isolée is credited with creating the very first microhouse record to reach the club charts. Isolée's 2000 album Rest, containing the hit "Beau Mot Plage", was arguably the first microhouse full-length.

History
Rajko Müller was born in Frankfurt, Germany but lived with his family in Algeria from the age of 7 to 12 and went to a French primary school. Around that time, his parents bought an organ for Christmas and he and a school friend attempted to make some synthpop. These experiments led them to buy a synthesizer and a drum machine. By the end of the eighties, Rajko grew tired of synthpop and EBM and listened more to rock music and independent music. In the early nineties, Müller's friends led him to discover house music, hip-hop and techno, and he embarked upon a fresh attempt to record electronic music. Müller gave a tape to his friend and DJ Andreas Baumecker, owner of Freundinnen records, who worked in a record store where the members of Playhouse Records used to work.

Müller's first Isolée material appeared on the music label Playhouse in 1997. Rest, Isolée's full-length album, followed in 2000, also on Playhouse. Müller has received wide acclaim, including being listed as the third-best reviewed album of the year on Metacritic for his 2005 album We Are Monster. His work is highly regarded in underground cultures of electronic music connoisseurs and aficionados.

Discography
Original albums
 Rest (2000)
 We Are Monster (2005)
 Well Spent Youth (2011)

Compilations and non-album EPs
 Western Store (2006, early singles compilation)
 System (1996)
 Initiate (1998)
 WesternStore (1998)
 I Owe You (1999)
 It's About (2002)
 Can't Sleep All Night (2003)
 Brazil.com (2003)
 Hermelin (2006)
 October Nightingale (2009)
 Albacares/Les Andalouses (2009)
 The Fantastic Researches of Yushin Maru (2010)
 Allowance (2013)
 Dennis (2013)
 Mangroove' (2017)
 2020 Candy Apple Red''

References

External links
    
 Official website
 Discogs: Isolée
 [ Isolée] at Allmusic
 Isolée bio
 Review of Western Store at Grooves Magazine

German electronic musicians
German techno musicians
Living people
Remixers
Year of birth missing (living people)